Jerzy Pietrzyk (born April 17, 1955) is a retired Polish sprinter who specialized in the 400 metres.

He was born in Warsaw and represented the clubs Górnik Zabrze and Gwardia Warszawa. He became European junior champion in 1973. In 1975 he won the gold medal in 400 metres at the 1975 Summer Universiade.

He competed in 400 metres at the 1976 and 1980 Summer Olympics, reaching the quarter-finals in 1976 and round one in 1980. In the 4 x 400 metres relay he won the silver medal at the 1976 Olympic Games with his teammates Ryszard Podlas, Jan Werner and Zbigniew Jaremski. He also competed in this event at the 1980 Olympic Games.

References

1955 births
Living people
Polish male sprinters
Olympic silver medalists for Poland
Athletes (track and field) at the 1976 Summer Olympics
Athletes (track and field) at the 1980 Summer Olympics
Olympic athletes of Poland
Athletes from Warsaw
Medalists at the 1976 Summer Olympics
Olympic silver medalists in athletics (track and field)
Universiade medalists in athletics (track and field)
Universiade gold medalists for Poland
Medalists at the 1975 Summer Universiade
20th-century Polish people